Rut Tellefsen (born 23 August 1930) is a Norwegian actress.

Personal life
Tellefsen was born in Malvik on 23 August 1930, a daughter of  Johan Fredriksen and Anna Bergljot Smaage. She was married to actor Tom Tellefsen from 1955 to 1962, and to Kjell Bækkelund from 1966 to 1972.

Career
Tellefsen made her stage debut at Det Norske Teatret in 1956. She worked for Fjernsynsteatret in its early days, during the 1960s, and she was assigned to Oslo Nye Teater 1969 to 1973. She was co-founder and later artistical director of Telemark Teater, and was assigned to Nationaltheatret from 1981 to 2001.

Awards
Tellefsen was awarded the Norwegian Theatre Critics Award for 1985/1986, but did not want to accept the prize. She received the Amanda Award in 1996 for her role in the film Kristin Lavransdatter. She was decorated Knight, First Class of the Order of St. Olav in 2000.

References

External links

Further reading

1930 births
Living people
People from Sør-Trøndelag
People from Malvik
Norwegian film actresses
Norwegian stage actresses